The following is a list of the national roads in the Democratic Republic of the Congo. The list is not exhaustive. Nominally, the DRC has designated about 40 national roads, but most are unpaved, and many are impassable due to disrepair or not yet built.

The DRC also has other notable roads.

See also

References

Roads in the Democratic Republic of the Congo
Road infrastructure in the Democratic Republic of the Congo
Roads
Roads
Congo